"Little Big Mom" is the tenth episode of the eleventh season of the American animated television series The Simpsons. It originally aired on the Fox network in the United States on January 9, 2000, the first episode of the new millennium. In the episode, while the rest of the Simpson family goes skiing, Marge remains at the ski lodge due to her fear of skiing, only to break her leg from a falling clock. As a result, while hospitalized, Marge leaves Lisa to take care of the house. When Bart and Homer refuse to help out with the chores, Lisa pulls a prank on them by making it look like they have leprosy.

The episode includes a guest appearance from Elwood Edwards, and features several references to Lucille Ball and her television work.

Plot
Homer stops Marge from throwing away the junk in the attic. When he finds some skis, never used, among the junk, he decides to take the family on a skiing holiday. Marge stays safely (she thinks) in the lodge – but a clock falls off a wall, fracturing a leg, and she is hospitalized.

Lisa assures her mother she can take her place at home, but Homer and Bart are no help, and the house is soon an utter mess. Lisa phones Marge and asks her to come back but Marge, who is enjoying her rest in hospital, untruthfully says she is not well enough. 

The ghost of Lucille Ball appears to Lisa and suggests a scheme, which Lisa carries out: she applies oatmeal and green poster paint to Homer and Bart's skin while they are asleep, and next morning both are convinced they have leprosy. On Ned Flanders' advice, they flee to a leper colony in Hawaii.

Marge comes home; Lisa has made it perfectly clean again. They go to Hawaii to retrieve the boys and assure them they do not have leprosy. But they already know: Homer has, with relish, eaten one of his "sores". They decline to go home: despite the painful electric needle treatments, they are enjoying the vacation too much.

Production

"Little Big Mom" was written by Carolyn Omine and directed by Mark Kirkland as part of the eleventh season of The Simpsons (1999–2000). Elwood Edwards, known as the voice of the Internet service provider America Online, guest starred in the episode as the Virtual Doctor that confirms Homer and Bart's leprosy.

Omine recalled in a retrospective that it was George Meyer who came up with the premise of Marge (ironically) injuring herself at a ski lodge. The scene where Ned Flanders shows up in skintight skiing uniform came about when one of the show's other writers began "talking about how there are those skiers who are really serious about skiing — the skiers who wear those skin-tight suits as if they're on an Olympic team. We'd done the joke before about Flanders having this amazing body, so it became Flanders in a super sexy ski outfit. We knew we wanted Flanders to make Homer uncomfortable, so we had him shaking his butt and saying, 'It feels like I’m wearing nothing at all!'" Both that line and the similarly iconic "Stupid, sexy Flanders" were in the initial draft of the script, though Omine admitted she could not remember if she came up with it, or if someone else threw it out while helping outline the episode's story.

She also commented, "When we first came up with the joke, we said that his ass should be really shapely — we made that clear. But when we got the animation back we wondered, 'Is it too much?' After a while we decided to just go for it and that was definitely the right call. Flanders is very hot — he should show it off."

The episode features several references to the late American actress Lucille Ball and her many television sitcoms starring characters named Lucy. For example, it is the ghost of Ball who gives Lisa the idea to trick Homer and Bart into thinking they have leprosy. Ball is portrayed with a cigarette in her hand in that scene, and speaks with a raspy voice. When Lisa first sees the ghost, she cries out "Lucy?", to which Ball responds "Lucy McGillicuddy Ricardo Carmichael. [Coughs] And I think there's some more." According to Michael Karol, author of the 2004 book Lucy A to Z, the last names "are those of Ball's characters from I Love Lucy and The Lucy Show. Left out were Lucy Carter of Here's Lucy and Lucy Barker of Life with Lucy." The Simpsons cast member Tress MacNeille provided the voice of Ball in the episode. Additional references to Ball's work featured in "Little Big Mom" include Homer and Bart watching I Love Lucy with the volume turned up high, disturbing Lisa when she is trying to sleep. An Itchy & Scratchy cartoon that references the "Job Switching" episode of I Love Lucy is also seen in the episode.

Release and reception
The episode originally aired on the Fox network in the United States on January 9, 2000. On October 7, 2008, it was released on DVD as part of the box set The Simpsons – The Complete Eleventh Season. Staff members Mike Scully, George Meyer, Matt Selman, Carolyn Omine, and Mark Kirkland participated in the DVD audio commentary for the episode. Deleted scenes from the episode were also included on the box set.

While reviewing the eleventh season of The Simpsons, DVD Movie Guide's Colin Jacobson commented: "We've seen 'the family goes to crap without Marge around' episodes in the past, so don't expect any reinvented wheels here. Still, the sight of Lisa in charge adds a decent spin, and the leprosy twist – while silly – proves amusing. It’s another unexceptional show but one with its moments."

Before this episode, The Simpsons had referenced Lucille Ball several times. Michael Karol wrote in Lucy A to Z that "perhaps the funniest tribute came in ... 'Little Big Mom.'" Dan Castellaneta, who provides the voice of Homer in the series, considers this episode to be one of his personal favorites.

The "Stupid Sexy Flanders" sequence has become a popular Internet meme. Don Caldwell, editor-in-chief of Know Your Meme, stated, "It's not in the top five Simpsons memes" but "it's a pretty big meme as far as Simpsons memes go", explaining "this scene in particular is very memorable and it's really simple and versatile, which is why it has such power as a meme." Entertainment writer Tyler Vendetti commented, "The image of Flanders' ass, as well as him saying, 'It feels like I'm wearing nothing at all,' gets stuck in Homer's head in that episode, but it also gets stuck in your head as a viewer, which is why I think that joke has become so popular online."

Because "Little Big Mom" deals with leprosy, it has never been released in Japan. According to Shari Ross Altarac in her doctoral dissertation "The Adaptation of U.S. Television in Foreign Markets: How France and Japan Put Their Distinctive Spin on The Simpsons", the reason behind this is that "Former segregation laws remain a sensitive topic in Japan, where litigation of leprosy cases and charges of human rights abuses by the Japanese government have ensued" (see Leprosy in Japan).

References

External links 

The Simpsons (season 11) episodes
2000 American television episodes
Television episodes written by Carolyn Omine